Central Teke is a member of the Teke languages dialect continuum of the Congolese plateau. Central Teke dialects are Ngungwel and Mpu (Mpumpum), Boo (Boma, Eboo – cf. Boma language), and Nzikou (Njyunjyu/Ndzindziu). They are spoken in the Malebo Pool region of the Republic of Congo, with an unknown number of Boo speakers in DRC.

References

Teke languages